Tyler "Ty" Rimmer (born March 23, 1992) is a Canadian professional ice hockey Goaltender. He is currently an unrestricted free agent who most recently played with the Cincinnati Cyclones of the ECHL.

Playing career
He played junior hockey in the Western Hockey League. He was traded to the Lethbridge Hurricanes from the Tri-City Americans on May 3, 2012.

In January 2015, Rimmer was diagnosed with testicular cancer. By March, 2015, Rimmer made a full recovery and joined Oklahoma City Barons for remainder of 2014–15 season.

On May 27, 2015, Rimmer remained in the Edmonton Oilers organization in signing a one-year AHL contract with the Bakersfield Condors. Rimmer appeared in 6 games with the Condors before he was reassigned to new ECHL affiliate, the Norfolk Admirals.

After three seasons within the Oilers affiliates, Rimmer left as a free agent and agreed to a one-year deal with Italian club, WSV Sterzing Broncos for the inaugural season in the Alps Hockey League on September 21, 2016.

Rimmer played one season in Italy before returning to North America and the ECHL, agreeing to a one-year deal with the Kansas City Mavericks on August 30, 2017. Prior to the commencement of the 2017–18 season, Rimmer was traded before appearing with the Mavericks to fellow ECHL outfit, the Greenville Swamp Rabbits, on October 8, 2017. Over the course of the season, Rimmer as the Swamp Rabbits starting goaltender appeared in 42 games. 

As a free agent, Rimmer opted to return to the Alps Hockey League, agreeing to a one-year contract with Austrian based, EC Kitzbühel, on May 21, 2018. Rimmer made 29 appearances in the Alps Hockey League before returning to North America and signing an ECHL contract with the Wichita Thunder, affiliate to former club, the Bakersfield Condors, on January 23, 2019. Rimmer made 12 appearances with the Thunder before he was traded to the Cincinnati Cyclones on March 7, 2019.

Awards and honours

References

External links

1992 births
Living people
Bakersfield Condors (1998–2015) players
Bakersfield Condors players
Bonnyville Pontiacs players
Brandon Wheat Kings players
Canadian ice hockey goaltenders
Cincinnati Cyclones (ECHL) players
Greenville Swamp Rabbits players
Lethbridge Hurricanes players
Manchester Monarchs (AHL) players
Norfolk Admirals (ECHL) players
Oklahoma City Barons players
Prince George Cougars players
St. Albert Steel players
Ice hockey people from Edmonton
Tri-City Americans players
Wichita Thunder players